Greetings From Birmingham is the seventh album by Scorn, released in September 2000 through Hymen Records. In May 1997, following the release of Zander, Mick Harris decided to end the band to finish relations with KK Records, and from 1997 to 1999, he was making music with other names and other musicians, until 2000, when returned with the band with the record company Hymen Records for Greetings from Birmingham.

Track listing

Personnel 
Anthony Burnham – photography
Mick Harris – instruments, production, mixing

References

External links 
 

2000 albums
Scorn (band) albums
Albums produced by Mick Harris